Renu Joseph popularly known as RJ Renu, is an Indian radio jockey, video jockey, TEDx speaker,  sports presenter, and celebrity interviewer based in Kochi, Kerala. She is best known as the host of the Club FM 94.3/104.8 show Love Bytes that ran for eight years, on radio and TV simultaneously, and also for being the sports presenter in Jio Cinema for FIFA 2022 World cup Malayalam stream.

Early life
Renu completed the BA degree in communicative English from St. Teresa's College, Ernakulam, and MBA from Rajagiri College of Social Sciences before choosing a career as radio jockey.

Career
Renu had her first break as the host of Kairali TV's Hello Good Evening as a replacement for the actress Remya Nambeesan and later continued with the shows Spicy India for Asianet Plus and Dream Home for Asianet News. She then joined the Mathrubhumi group as radio jockey as the host of the Club FM 94.3/104.8 show Love Bytes.  The show became a huge success, prompting the makers to convert it to a TV show with the same name for Kappa TV. She also does Tube Grid, a show about viral videos on the same channel, and Star Jam, a celebrity chat show on Club FM 94.3/104.8. 

She was also the host for FIFA 2022 World Cup at Jio Cinemas live Malayalam streaming service.  

She does a celibrity interview show The Uncensored Show in Radio Mirchi Malayalam.

Radio Host

Television host

Podcast

Social media

References

Living people
Indian radio presenters
People from Ernakulam district
Indian women radio presenters
Indian women television presenters
Indian television presenters
Women artists from Kerala
Year of birth missing (living people)
Actresses in Malayalam cinema
St. Teresa's College alumni